Alexandre Arbez (born 5 July 1978) is a French bobsledder. He competed in the four man event at the 2002 Winter Olympics.

References

External links
 

1978 births
Living people
French male bobsledders
Olympic bobsledders of France
Bobsledders at the 2002 Winter Olympics
Sportspeople from Annecy